The NORCECA qualification tournament for the 2012 Women's Olympic Volleyball Tournament was held from 29 April – 5 May 2012.

Venue
 High Performance Sports Center of Baja California, Tijuana, Baja California, Mexico

Preliminary round
All times are Pacific Time Zone (UTC−07:00).

Pool A

Pool B

Final round

Championship bracket

5th–8th places bracket

Quarterfinals

5th–8th places

Semifinals

7th place

5th place

3rd place

Final

Final standing

Individual awards

Most Valuable Player

Best Scorer

Best Spiker

Best Blocker

Best Server

Best Digger

Best Setter

Best Receiver

Best Libero

External links
Official website of the NORCECA Qualification Tournament

Olympic Qualification Women North America
Volleyball qualification for the 2012 Summer Olympics
2012 in women's volleyball
Vol